Manohara is a 1954 Indian Tamil-language historical fantasy film directed by L. V. Prasad and written by M. Karunanidhi. Starring Sivaji Ganesan, T. R. Rajakumari, P. Kannamba and Girija, the film was based on the play of the same name by Pammal Sambandha Mudaliar. It was released on 3 March 1954. The film was simultaneously shot in Telugu and Hindi under the same title. Those versions were released on 3 June 1954.

Plot 
Kesarivarman, an artiste, comes to the court of king Purushothaman, along with his wife Vasanthasenai to perform. The king falls in love with her. To get rid of her husband and be with the king, Vasanthasenai mixes poison in Kesari's milk. Kesari dies, but returns as an invisible man with the help of a sage. He seeks revenge. Though Purushothaman is already married to queen Padmavathi and has a son Manoharan alias Manohara, king Purushothaman becomes attracted to Vasanthasenai and starts living with her.

Padmavathi becomes angry with the king, and vows never to see him again till he separates from Vasanthasenai. Vasanthasenai, pregnant with Kesari's child, convinces Purushothaman the child belongs to him. The child is born and named Vasanthan. Years roll by and Vasanthasenai influences Purushothaman in every decision, which annoys Manoharan. Manoharan respects his mother and never violates her orders. Padmavathi makes him promise that he would never harm Vasanthasenai as such an act would affect her husband's happiness. She orders him to restore the honour of their kingdom by retrieving the prestigious throne which was seized by king Muthuvijayan.

Manohara and his friend Rajapriyan attack the kingdom of Muthuvijayan; not only does he get the throne back, he also falls for Muthuvijayan's daughter Vijaya, who tries to kill him to protect the country's honour. He marries her and returns to his kingdom with her. Manoharan becomes upset on seeing that instead of his mother, Vasanthasenai is accompanying the king to the prestigious throne. When he accuses her, she abuses his mother, prompting him to raise his hand to attack her. However, remembering his promise, he stops.

Purushothaman, angry on seeing Manoharan's act, orders him to apologise. Manoharan refused and is sentenced to death by King Purusothaman. Even his mother's pleas to the king fail. Vasanthasenai also hatches a conspiracy, and gets Padmavathi and Vijaya imprisoned on false charges. When Manoharan is taken in a chariot for his death sentence, the invisible Kesari saves him. Manoharan, with the help of the minister Sathyaseelar and Rajapriyan, re-enters the palace disguised as a messenger Atchayan and works under Vasanthasenai.

Ukrasenan, an opponent of Purushothaman, enters the palace disguised as a sage, on the invitation of Vasanthasenai. Manoharan, still disguised, makes Purushothaman see Vasanthasenai and Ukrasenan in a compromising position in the bedroom; when Purushothaman questions her, she imprisons him too. Purushothaman realises his mistakes and feels regret. Vijaya delivers a child in prison. Vasanthasenai orders that the child be brought to the Court and killed. "Atchayan", in his anxiety to see his newborn, visits the prison. Meanwhile, the real Atchayan escapes and meets Ukrasenan. They understand the truth and come rushing to the prison to see the disguised Manoharan with his child. He is arrested and brought to court.

Vasanthasenai tries to kill Manoharan's child despite Padmavathi's pleas. When Padmavathi explains to Vasanthasenai why she had been patient all along, Vasanthasenai does not understand and slaps her. Enraged, Padmavathi decides it is enough of patience and time to respond, and advises Manohara to restore the honour of the family. Though he is chained to a wall, his mother's words make him powerful enough to break free and a fight ensues. Manoharan, Sathyaseelar, Rajapriyan and their army attack the queen's army and all the enemies are eliminated. Kesari comes to Manoharan's help in the process. When Vasanthasenai kills Vasanthan, she is taken by Kesari for the ultimate punishment in his hideout. Purushothaman is released and unites with his family.

Cast 

Male
 Sivaji Ganesan as Manoharan
 Sadhasiva Rao as Purushothaman
 S. A. Natarajan as Ukrasenan
 Javar Seetharaman as Sathyaseelar
 S. S. Rajendran as Rajapriyan
 T. V. Radhakrishnan as Vasanthan
 Pandian as Vikatan
 V. M. Ezhumalai as Doctor
 M. R. Saminathan as Buddhist Yanan
 M. K. Mustafa as Kesarivarman

Female
 T. R. Rajakumari as Vasanthasenai
 P. Kannamba as Padmavathi
 Girija as Vijaya
 P. K. Saraswathi as Vasanthasenai (drama)
 Pandari Bai as Padmavathi (drama)
 Muthulakshmi as Malini
Dance
 Kumari Kamala

Production 

Manohara was a play staged by Pammal Sambandha Mudaliar in the 1930s; he even acted in a film version which was released in 1930. K. R. Ramasamy successfully staged Manohara under his own banner, playing the lead actor, Sivaji Ganesan portrayed the role of the queen in the play. Jupiter Pictures announced the film adaptation of Manohara with Ramasamy in the title role and A. S. A. Sami as the director. Elangovan, was engaged to write the script. However, this project was shelved and Ganesan was brought on board. Producer signed Ganesan either for the role of Rajapriyan or Manohara. However Ganesan was keen on doing the titular character and got selected. Elangovan worked on the script for sometime under the new setup, but he was soon replaced by M. Karunanidhi. Karunanidhi rewrote Mudaliar's play, introducing changes like the climactic sequence for which he drew inspiration from Samson and Delilah, especially the part where the blind Samson pushes the pillars down. L. V. Prasad was selected to direct the film.

Soundtrack 
The music was composed by S. V. Venkatraman and T. R. Ramanathan.

Tamil Songs

Lyrics by K. D. Sundaram, Surabhi, Chellamuthukavi & Udumalai Narayana Kavi.

T. R. Ramanathan composed the music for Singara Paingkiliye Pesu and Nilaavile Ullaasamaaga Aadalaam.

Telugu Songs

Hindi Songs

Release and reception 

Manohara was released on 3 March 1954. Ananda Vikatan wrote "Manohara is an example if there is a good script combined with lively dialogues and powerful acting, the public will appreciate and love such films". According to historian G. Dhananjayan, the film became a success due to the performances of Ganesan and Kannamba and dialogues by Karunanidhi. It was later released in Telugu and Hindi with the same title. Jaggayya dubbed his voice for Sivaji Ganesan in Telugu. Aatreya wrote dialogues for the Telugu version.

References

Bibliography

External links 
 

1950s Tamil-language films
1954 films
Indian multilingual films
1950s Telugu-language films
Films directed by L. V. Prasad
Films scored by S. V. Venkatraman
Films with screenplays by M. Karunanidhi
Indian films based on plays
Indian historical fantasy films
1950s historical fantasy films
Indian black-and-white films
Films scored by T. R. Ramanathan